Elba Vergés Prats (born 24 October 1995) is a Spanish footballer who plays as a defender for Alavés.

Club career
Vergés started her career at Barcelona B.

References

External links
Profile at La Liga

1995 births
Living people
Women's association football defenders
Spanish women's footballers
Footballers from Barcelona
Sportswomen from Catalonia
FC Barcelona Femení B players
RCD Espanyol Femenino players
ASJ Soyaux-Charente players
SD Eibar Femenino players
Primera División (women) players
Spanish expatriate women's footballers
Spanish expatriate sportspeople in France
Expatriate women's footballers in France
FC Levante Las Planas players